Three Wise Men is a 2008 Finnish drama film directed by Mika Kaurismäki.

Cast 
 Kari Heiskanen - Erkki
 Pertti Sveholm - Matti
 Timo Torikka - Rauno
 Irina Björklund - Magdaleena
 Tommi Eronen - Tero
  - Taina
 Pirkko Hämäläinen - Tiina
  - Riitta
 Aake Kalliala - Karaoke host
 Peter Franzén - Santa Claus

References

External links 

2008 drama films
2008 films
Finnish drama films
2000s Finnish-language films